David Pittard (born 29 January 1992) is a British racing driver who most recently competed in the FIA World Endurance Championship.

Career

Early career
Pittard began his circuit racing career in 2010, taking part in the Britain-based Toyota MR2 Racing Series, which he would return to in 2011. He would add a campaign in the BRSCC Sports 2000 Pinto Championship during the 2011 season, before taking on the Britcar Endurance Series in 2012. Ahead of the 2013 season, Pittard announced that he'd be taking part in the Ginetta GT5 Challenge. In his opening season of competition, Pittard scored his maiden victory in the first race of the weekend at Silverstone, taking two more alongside seven podiums en route to a fifth-place finish in the overall championship. Owing to his performance in the championship, Pittard was elevated to BRDC Rising Star status at season's end. Pittard moved to the Ginetta GT4 Supercup in 2014, driving for SV Racing. After claiming a podium each in the opening two weekends, Pittard took his first victory of the season at Thruxton in May. Pittard doubled up with a victory during the second race as well, elevating him to first in the championship. He would claim another victory at Croft before sweeping the Silverstone weekend, eventually finishing second in the championship to Charlie Robertson. Following his strong rookie season, SV Racing team boss Danny Buxton stated that he believed Pittard had a bright future in GT racing. After returning to the Ginetta GT4 Supercup in 2015 for a pair of races, as well as a one-off in the North America-based FARA Endurance Championship, Pittard stepped away from professional racing until 2017.

GT racing
2017 saw Pittard return to pro racing, taking part in the British GT Championship with Lanan Racing. In line with his Ginetta roots, Pittard and co-driver Alex Reed took part in the GT4 class with a Ginetta G55 GT4, taking part in the Silver sub-class. The duo claimed their first and only victory of the season at Oulton Park; one of four podium finishes as they finished third in the class championship. Pittard supplemented his British GT campaign with historic racing, taking part in the FIA Masters Historic Sports Car Championship. 

2018 saw Pittard travel to Germany, taking on a drive in the Nürburgring Endurance Series for Walkenhorst Motorsport. In just his third race behind the wheel of a GT3 car, he took pole position for the sixth race of the season. Pittard cited his decision to take up a drive in the series as an effort to attract the attention of a manufacturer for a factory drive. Ahead of the 2019 season, Pittard signed a full-time contract with Walkenhorst, who would employ him in the Nürburgring Endurance Series, Nürburgring 24 Hours, and 24 Hours of Spa. Pittard returned to the Nürburgring in 2019, claiming further victories in the Nürburgring Endurance Series. At the end of the season, he cited his goal in the immediate future as becoming a BMW factory driver.

In 2020, Pittard joined Walkenhorst for their entry into the Intercontinental GT Challenge, joining BMW factory drivers Martin Tomczyk and Nick Yelloly. Although the team didn't participate in the opening round at Bathurst, they claimed a podium at Indianapolis and would finish ninth in the overall championship. The following year, Pittard would join Walkenhorst for a full season campaign in the GT World Challenge Europe Endurance Cup, taking part in the Pro class. Through five races, the team would finish with just four total points, taking 28th in the championship. At the end of the season, Pittard would take part in both the BMW M Motorsport selected driver test in Spain as well as the WEC Rookie Test, where he would pilot an Aston Martin Vantage GTE. The move would be somewhat of a harbinger for Pittard, who would join Aston Martin for the 2022 FIA World Endurance Championship. However, his status was subject to a degree of confusion in the pre-season. After initially being confirmed as a full factory driver, Aston Martin Racing later stated that he was merely contracted to the Northwest AMR team, the customer operation with which Pittard was competing in 2022, to preserve his ranking as an FIA Silver-ranked driver. Paired with Nicki Thiim and Paul Dalla Lana, the trio would claim their sole victory of the season during the opening round at Sebring, but registered two further podiums and finished second in the GTE Am championship. At the end-of-season BRDC awards ceremony, Pittard was handed the Woolf Barnato Trophy, given to the highest-placed British driver in a British car at the 24 Hours of Le Mans.

Racing record

Career summary

Complete GT World Challenge Europe results

GT World Challenge Europe Endurance Cup

Complete WeatherTech SportsCar Championship results
(key) (Races in bold indicate pole position)

Complete FIA World Endurance Championship results

24 Hours of Le Mans results

References

External links 
 

Living people
1992 births
English racing drivers
Sportspeople from Hertfordshire
Ginetta GT4 Supercup drivers
British GT Championship drivers
Blancpain Endurance Series drivers
Nürburgring 24 Hours drivers
FIA World Endurance Championship drivers
WeatherTech SportsCar Championship drivers
24 Hours of Le Mans drivers
BMW M drivers
Aston Martin Racing drivers